John Henslow may refer to:

 Sir John Henslow (Surveyor of the Navy) (1730–1815), a naval architect
 John Stevens Henslow (1796–1861), botanist and Charles Darwin's mentor